Lady Anna (Anne) Cunningham, Marchioness of Hamilton (died 1646) led a mixed-sex cavalry troop during the "Battle" of Berwick on 5 June 1639.

Background and family
Lady Anna was the fourth daughter of James Cunningham, 7th Earl of Glencairn and Margaret, daughter of Sir Colin Campbell of Glenorchy, a family noted for its early commitment to Protestantism. Her sister was the memoirist Lady Margaret Cunningham.

She married James Hamilton, 2nd Marquess of Hamilton on 30 January 1603. They had two sons, James Hamilton, 1st Duke of Hamilton (1606–1649) and William Hamilton, 2nd Duke of Hamilton (1616–1651) and three daughters, Lady Anne Hamilton (married Hugh, 7th Earl of Eglinton), Lady Margaret Hamilton (married John, Earl of Crawford and Lindsay) and Lady Mary Hamilton (died 1633, married James Douglas, 2nd Earl of Queensberry).

Historical importance
Her historical importance is as a defender of the Presbyterian Church in Scotland against Charles I attempts to convert the whole of Scotland to Anglicanism and her active leadership in the National Covenant resistance movement.

Her son, James Hamilton, 1st Duke of Hamilton, had sided with Charles I. When he attempted to land an army on the Scottish Coast in 1639, she organised the defences, raised a cavalry troop, and "came forth with pistol which she vowed to discharge upon her son if he offered to come ashore." A correspondent of the time, Edward Norgate, wrote, "She goeth in armour and with a pistoll by her side readie charged, and wishes him there, saying shee would burie the bullets in his bowells."

The cavalry rode under a banner showing a hand repelling a prayer book with the motto For God, the King, Religion and the Covenant. This was at the time of the Battle of Berwick on 5 June 1639.

The struggle with Charles I led to the Scots' right to a free church assembly and a free parliament.

Her great-great-grandson was Sir William Hamilton the husband of Emma, Lady Hamilton who is best known as the mistress of Lord Nelson.

References

External links
Portrait of Lady Anne Cunningham, Marchioness of Hamilton

Births circa 1580
1646 deaths
Scottish military personnel
Women in the English Civil War
17th-century Scottish women
17th-century Scottish people
Hamilton
Daughters of Scottish earls